Charles Chalk (1876–24 May 1945) was a footballer, born in Gibraltar who played for Rangers, Hamilton, East Stirlingshire, Dumbarton and Partick Thistle.

References

1876 births
Rangers F.C. players
Hamilton Academical F.C. players
East Stirlingshire F.C. players
Dumbarton F.C. players
Partick Thistle F.C. players
1945 deaths
Scottish Football League players

Association footballers not categorized by position
Gibraltarian footballers